The Micklem's mole-rat (Fukomys micklemi) is a species of rodent in the family Bathyergidae. It is found in Zambia. It is a subterranean species of chisel tooth diggers.

It is a social species, and this has been suggested to account for its more diverse and extensive vocal repertoire than has been observed in eusocial species of Bathyergidae.  As a result of DNA analysis it has been suggested that the species may need to be subdivided.

References 

Bathyergidae
Mammals of Zambia
Mammals described in 1909